Cordylopteryx lesneae is a species of tephritid or fruit flies in the genus Cordylopteryx of the family Tephritidae.

Distribution
Mozambique, Zimbabwe.

References

Tephritinae
Insects described in 1933
Taxa named by Eugène Séguy
Diptera of Africa